The  (official name: Akita City Yabase Sports Park Baseball Stadium) is a stadium in Akita, Akita, Japan.

Famous incident
Jim Traber of Kintetsu Buffaloes was ejected on May 19, 1991.

Gallery

References

Location map

Baseball venues in Japan 
Buildings and structures completed in 1941
Sports venues completed in 1941
Sports venues in Akita Prefecture